James Marshall Tory (1904-1994) was a member of the famous Tory family of Toronto and brothers to John Stewart Donald Tory and John A. Tory.

Tory was born in 1904 to John Alexander Tory and Abigail Georgina Buckley in Toronto, married  Pearl Millar Kennedy and had three children including son Edward Alexander Tory (1938-1994).

His nephew James Marshall Tory and grandson James C. Tory are members of the Torys firm.

Tory died in Toronto on July 10, 1994.

References

1904 births
1994 deaths
James Marshall
Lawyers in Ontario
People from Toronto
20th-century Canadian lawyers